Camelimonas lactis is a Gram-negative, rod-shaped and non-spore-forming  bacteria from the genus of Camelimonas which has been isolated from camel milk in the United Arab Emirates.

References

Hyphomicrobiales
Bacteria described in 2010